The A4232, which is also known either as the Peripheral Distributor Road (PDR) or the Cardiff Link Road, is a distributor road in Cardiff, the capital of Wales.

The first section of the PDR to be completed was the Southern Way Link Road in 1978 and the latest section was phase 1 of the Eastern Bay Link Road, known as Ewart Parkinson Road in 2017. When fully completed, the road will form part of the Cardiff ring road system. The PDR runs west, south and east of Cardiff, with the M4 between junction 30 and junction 33 completing the northern section. The PDR is dual carriageway for its entire length except for Rover Way and the East Moors Viaduct, which is a single carriageway. The entire length of the road has clearway restrictions on it.

It has 5 large viaducts (Ely Viaduct, Grangetown Viaduct, Taff Viaduct, Eastern Bay Link Viaduct and the East Moors Viaduct), 1 tunnel (Queen's Gate Tunnel) and 2 spur roads (Cogan Spur and Central Link Road). The road has many grade separated interchanges.

History 

The road was conceived in the early 1970s, and planning by South Glamorgan County Council began in the late 1970s. At that stage the road was planned to be completed by 1995 and would relieve Ely, Grangetown, Butetown and East Moors of through traffic and provide a fast link to the national motorway network via the M4 and A48(M). The first section of the PDR to be completed was the Southern Way Link Road between Newport Road (A4161 road) and the Eastern Avenue (A48 road) in 1978 and the last section of the PDR, the first phase of the Eastern Bay Link Road, which was opened to the public in June 2017.
  
The former chairman of the South Glamorgan County Council environment committee, Councillor Paddy Kitson, called the road a "necklace of opportunity" due to its shape and also the opportunities for regeneration. By 1 April 1996 the responsibility for the road was transferred from South Glamorgan County Council to the unitary authority of Cardiff Council. Much of the funding for the road had been grant aided from the European Community and the UK Government on the basis that it would improve the economic viability of the area and bring in new jobs and industry. However, since the completion of the Butetown Link Road, funding for further developments have been at a standstill, and to date  including spurs are open to traffic with plans for a further . The "missing link", the second and final phase of the Eastern Bay Link Road, is still to be built.

Route description 

The PDR has 3 separate sections: the Capel Llanilltern Interchange (M4 J33) to the Ocean Way roundabout, the Lamby Way roundabout to the Llanedeyrn Interchange (A48) and the Pontprennau Interchange (A48) to the Pentwyn Interchange (M4 J30).

For the majority of this section it is the boundary between the City of Cardiff to the east and the Vale of Glamorgan to the west.

{| class="wikitable"
|- align="center" bgcolor="#00703C" style="color: #ffd200;font-size:120%;"
| colspan="3" | A4232 (Trunk Road)
|- align="center" 
!scope=col| Clockwise exits
!scope=col| Junction / Interchange
!scope=col| Anti-Clockwise exits
|- align='center'
| Bridgend, Newport, M4Exit only
| M4 J33Capel Llanilltern InterchangeCardiff West services
| Start of A4232 (trunk road)
|- align='center'
| No access or exit
| St. Fagans
| Museum of Welsh Life 
 
|- align='center'
| Start of A4232 (trunk road)
| Culverhouse Cross 
| A48 (W) Cardiff WestA48 (E) BarryA4050 Cardiff Airport 
|- align="center" bgcolor="white" style="color: black;font-size:120%;" style="font-size:120%; border-top: black 2px solid;"
| colspan=3 | A4232
|- 
! Clockwise exits
! Junction / Interchange
! Anti-Clockwise exits
|- align='center'
| A48 (W) Cardiff WestA48 (E) A4050 Cardiff Airport Barry
| Culverhouse Cross 
| Start of A4232
|- align='center'
| B4267, Industrial area, Athletics StadiumPark and Ride
| Leckwith 
| B4267, Industrial area, Athletics StadiumCardiff City Stadium
|- align='center'
| A4055, Barry, Penarth
| Ferry Road 
| A4055, Barry, Penarth 
|- align='center'
| No Exit
| Stuart Street
| Techniquest MuseumNo access
|- align='center'
| colspan=3 | Queen's Gate Tunnel
|- align='center'
| A4234, City centrePorth Teigr, DocksAtlantic Wharf, Porth TeigrCardiff Bay, Capital Waterside 
| Queen's Gate roundabout
| A4234, City centreDocks, Atlantic WharfPorth Teigr, Cardiff BayCapital Waterside, County Hall
|- align='center'
| Start of A4232
| Ocean Way roundabout 
| Ocean Park, Castle Works, DocksEnd of A4232
|- align='center' bgcolor=#ffdead style="color: black;font-size:100%;"
| colspan="3" style="font-size:9pt"|Ocean Way roundabout to the Lamby Way / Rover Way roundabout(phase 2 of the Eastern Bay Link Road)

This section partly opened in 1978, from the Lamby Way roundabout to the Llanedeyrn Interchange on the A48, is the oldest section of the PDR.

{| class="wikitable"
|- align="center" bgcolor="white" style="color: black;font-size:120%;"
| colspan="3" | A4232
|- 
!scope=col| Clockwise exits
!scope=col| Junction / Interchange
!scope=col| Anti-Clockwise exits
|- align='center'
| Lamby Way, Rover WayEnd of A4232 
| Lamby Way / Rover Way roundabout
| Start of A4232
|- align='center'
| A4161, City centre Exit only
| Southern Way 
| Access only
|- align='center'
| Start of A4232
| A48 Llanedeyrn   
| A48, Newport, City CentreEnd of A4232
|- align='center'
|colspan=3 align=center bgcolor="#ddffdd" |A48

The road between the Llanedeyrn Interchange to the Pontprennau Interchange is the A48 (Eastern Avenue); it too is a dual carriageway and is a concurrent road with the PDR; there are no plans to renumber this section of the A48.
 
{| class="wikitable"
|- align="center" bgcolor="white" style="color: black;font-size:120%;"
| colspan="3" | A4232
|-
!scope=col| Clockwise exits
!scope=col| Junction / Interchange
!scope=col| Anti-Clockwise exits
|-
|colspan=3 align=center bgcolor="#ddffdd" |A48
|- align='center'
| A48
| A48 Pontprennau
| Start of A4232
 
|- align='center'
| Pontprennau, Cardiff Gate Retail Park,Llanedeyrn Village 
| Heol Pontprennau roundabout
| Pontprennau, Cardiff Gate Retail Park,Llanedeyrn Village 
|- align='center'
| Start of A4232
| M4 J30Pentwyn InterchangeCardiff Gate services  
| Bridgend, Newport, M4Rudry, DraethenEnd of A4232

Link roads 

A map of all the link roads and spur roads can be seen by clicking Map of all coordinates opposite

Each section of the road was completed in separate link roads.

Capel Llanilltern – Culverhouse Cross Link Road 

The £14.5 million Capel Llanilltern – Culverhouse Cross Link Road, also known as the A4232 Trunk Road (as it is the only section of the PDR which is a trunk road), between the Capel Llanilltern Interchange and the Culverhouse Cross Interchange was opened in 1985. It was designed to provide a by-pass for traffic from the M4 to the Vale of Glamorgan. The trunk road is maintained by the South Wales Trunk Road Agency (SWTRA) on behalf of the Welsh Assembly Government (WAG). The remainder of the PDR is a primary route, which is maintained by Cardiff Council. In 2006 variable message signs were installed on the Capel Llanilltern – Culverhouse Cross Link Road by Techspan Systems to display warning messages about road and weather conditions, accidents, congestion and major events in the area. 
  
 Ely Viaduct

The Ely Viaduct crosses over the River Ely and also the main South Wales railway line.

It was constructed in segments, each weighing between 54 tons for plain segments and 93 tons for the main segments.

Ely Link Road 

The Ely Link Road between the Culverhouse Cross Interchange and the Leckwith Interchange, sometimes referred to as the Leckwith Road Interchange. It was designed to relieve Ely of through traffic and partly cuts into Leckwith Hill.

Grangetown Link Road 

The  Grangetown Link Road between the Leckwith Interchange and the Ferry Road Interchange was opened on 3 May 1988. It includes the Grangetown Viaduct.

 Grangetown Viaduct

The viaduct was designed by South Glamorgan County Council. Robert Benaim and Associates, now called Benaim UK Ltd designed the initial launching system for the glued segmental structure.

Butetown Link Road 

The  Butetown Link Road between the Ferry Road Interchange and the Queen's Gate Roundabout was opened on 27 March 1995 by Neil Kinnock at the time the European Commissioner for Transport. Construction of the link road commenced on 15 October 1993 and it was the last link road to be built before the Eastern Bay Link Road opened in 2017. It includes the Taff Viaduct, also known as the Butetown Link Road Bridge, and the Queen's Gate Tunnel, which is also known simply as the Butetown Tunnel.

In 1987 South Glamorgan County Council had intended to build a viaduct cross the River Taff and then go onto an elevated section through Butetown "on stilts". But the newly formed Cardiff Bay Development Corporation along with local residents objected to the scheme that they said would cut through Butetown and split the community, creating an unnecessary physical barrier between the two areas to the north and south of the link road.  By 1988 South Glamorgan County Council had agreed to change the design of the link road, despite having already spent 6 years of design work on the link road meant that a tunnel had to be built instead. The cost of the Butetown Link Road was estimated to cost £35 million, but this had risen to £45M in 1988, before the design change.

The contract to build the Butetown Link Road was eventually won by a local company Davies Middleton & Davies Ltd in a joint venture with an Italian contractor, Cogefar-Impressit UK Ltd.  The bid of £60 million undercut all other bids by £10 million, Davies Middleton & Davies Ltd subsequently went into administrative receivership. 
  
 Queen's Gate Tunnel

The Queen's Gate Tunnel, also known as the Butetown Tunnel, is underneath southern Butetown and follows a line underneath the Wales Millennium Centre.  The  twin tunnel was constructed using the cut and cover method of construction, which involves digging a trench for the tunnel and then roofing it over.  The tunnel was constructed using reinforced concrete and a central wall separates the two sets of traffic.

South Glamorgan County Council originally awarded the contract for the management, installation, testing and commissioning of all electrical and mechanical services for the tunnel, and the water pumping stations to EI·WHS Ltd.  They still maintain the tunnel on behalf of Cardiff Council.

Immediately to the east of the tunnels is an unfinished viaduct which had been built to continue over Queen's Gate Roundabout to link up with the next section. The viaduct will not be completed during the 2016-2017 construction of the Eastern Bay Link road, but remains available for future development.

 Taff Viaduct

Construction of the  Taff Viaduct includes a dual-carriageway roadway plus a foot and cycle path. South Glamorgan County Council was the local authority in charge of the project at the time and construction of the viaduct began in March 1991.  The Taff Viaduct crosses the River Taff at Cardiff Bay and is known locally as Pollinger Bridge.

The viaduct was constructed using precast concrete segments, which is widely used in the construction industry for medium to long span viaducts. Segments were made in a casting yard near the site and then transported for final assembly of the viaduct.

Eastern Bay Link Road

Construction on the first phase of the  Eastern Bay Link Road, also known as the Ewart Parkinson Road, began on 17 March 2016. It runs from the Queen's Gate Roundabout to the Ocean Way roundabout and was opened on 15 June 2017 by the First Minister of Wales Carwyn Jones. Only phase 1 of the  road between Queen's Gate Roundabout and Ocean Way Interchange has been constructed, with a feasibility study being carried out into the final phase (Phase 2) of the link road between Ocean Way roundabout to the A48 Eastern Avenue. The link road is a two lane dual carriageway with a  speed limit eastbound and a  speed limit westbound.

For many years this link road had been mothballed due to the costs involved. The link road had previously been known as the East Moors Link Road – Phase 1 and 3, but it also included the East Moors Viaduct, which was originally known as the East Moors Link Road – Phase 2. Later it became known as the Cardiff Bay Link Road, then renamed again becoming the Eastern Bay Link Road.

The Eastern Bay Link Road was subject to many planning proposals since the last link road (the Butetown Link Road) was completed in 1995, namely a local transport plan (Local Transport Plan 2000–2016) in August 2000, a green paper (A Change of Gear) in December 2002 and a white paper (Keeping Cardiff Moving) in May 2003. The cost of the link road was estimated to cost £162 million in 2001 and this increased to £180 million by August 2002. It was suggested that it could be paid for by congestion charging, although a public-private partnership was also considered.

The original route of the link road had been challenged by both Friends of the Earth Cymru, and also the Royal Society for the Protection of Birds (RSPB), who had both lodged formal objections against the link road.

The new route would be different from the earlier proposal and would avoid any encroachment into the nature conservation area, which Friends of the Earth and the RSPB had objected to. The new route would ensure that there would be no objections.

It was revealed on 14 June 2013 that Edwina Hart, Minister for Economy, Science and Transport in the Welsh Government supported the completion the Eastern Bay Link Road. She said that the link road would; improve access to Cardiff Bay, improve access to the Cardiff Central Enterprise Zone and enhance connections within the Cardiff City Region. The overall objectives of the road would be to:

Increase accessibility from east Cardiff to major employment sites in the East Moors area, Cardiff Bay and the Central Cardiff Enterprise Zone
Provide a more direct route between the Butetown Tunnel and Rover Way
Reduce congestion at the junctions on Tyndall Street by removing traffic currently using the Ocean Way- East Tyndall Street – Central Link route
Reduce journey times for private and commercial road users 
Help economic regeneration
Enhance road safety and reduce casualties
Improve resilience on the strategic road network around Cardiff
Provide more opportunities for cycling and walking

 Phase 1 (Ewart Parkinson Road)

On 2 May 2014, Edwina Hart approved the procurement of the design–build contractor, advance service diversion works and communications arrangements for the Eastern Bay Link Road. In April 2015, it was announced by the Welsh Government that the  £27.3m Eastern Bay Link Road from the Queens Gate roundabout to the Ocean Way roundabout at Tremorfa known as the "roundabout to nowhere", would be designed by Capita Property and Infrastructure with Cass Hayward being the specialist bridge designer. It was constructed by Dawnus and Ferrovial Agroman UK in a joint venture. Construction began on Phase 1 of the link road on 17 March 2016, This phase of the road was opened on Thursday 15 June 2017 by the First Minister of Wales Carwyn Jones.

 Phase 2

It was reported on 9 December 2016 by Cardiff Council that a feasibility study into Phase 2 between the Ocean Way roundabout to the A48 Eastern Avenue would take place and would be funded by the Welsh Government, as will all the construction costs for Phase 2. Extending the link road
 from Ocean Way roundabout to the A48 (via the Southern Way Link Road) could take between three and five years to complete.

On 21 October 2021, Huw Thomas, leader of Cardiff Council said: 

Only a kilometre of new road has been built in Cardiff since devolution. I think there is a compelling case to be made in particular around the Eastern Bay Link, completing from the Queensgate roundabout eastwards to the end of Rover Way to be upgraded. That's really important not just as a gateway to the city and Cardiff Bay, but as a way of diverting traffic away from residential areas including my own ward of Splott. On the Easterm Bay Link, conversations at an official level have been happening for some years now with a decent amount of detail. I will certainly be making representations, when I next meet the climate change minister and the deputy minister for transport, of the importance of that road.

Since October 2021 Arcadis have been conducting a WelTAG (Welsh Transport Planning Appraisal Guidance) stage one study. No date has been set as to when the study would be finished and published. Cardiff Council would not announce what options Arcadis would be looking at before the study was complete. They said that it could “misinform the public of the options available and allow the public to think a certain outcome may be possible”.

Southern Way Link Road 

The Southern Way Link Road, generally known simply as Southern Way, was built in two parts; the first section of Southern Way to be completed was between Newport Road (A4161 road) and the Eastern Avenue (A48 road) in 1978. The final section of the link road was built between Newport Road and the Rover Way – Lamby Way roundabout and was opened in 1984 at a cost of £9 million and includes the East Moors Viaduct, which is also known as the Southern Way Flyover. In 1987 it was envisaged that the present single-carriage would be "twinned" as a dual-carriageway, the same as the rest of the PDR. The  link road now runs from the Rover Way – Lamby Way Roundabout to the Llanedeyrn Interchange on the A48.

 East Moors Viaduct
The  East Moors Viaduct, which is also known as the Southern Way Flyover, was also designed by Robert Benaim and Associates who won the ICE (Institution of Civil Engineers) Project Award and also a Concrete Society Commendation, both in 1985 for work on the viaduct. The viaduct was constructed by concrete box girder deck of segmental construction. The East Moors Viaduct was originally known as the East Moors Link Road – Phase 2, but now forms part of the Southern Way Link Road.

Pentwyn Link Road 

The Pentwyn Link Road, which is also known as the North Pentwyn Link Road and the Pontprennau Link Road, runs from the Pontprennau Interchange on the A48 and the Pentwyn Interchange on the M4 (junction 30). It provides a link between the Eastern Avenue (A48) and the M4 so that westbound traffic from the east of the city can get onto the M4 without having to go through the city, via the A48 and A470. In addition it also provides access to the community of Pontprennau to the national road network. This link was financed by private developers as part of a large scale housing development at Pontprennau.

Public Art & Commemorative Stones

Spur roads

Cogan Spur (A4055) 

The Cogan Spur, which is also known as the Cogan Link, from the Ferry Road Interchange to Barons Court Junction on the A4160 was opened in 1988. It is only , but it is an important link to provide access to the PDR from Penarth and the southern part of the Vale of Glamorgan.  It also bypasses Penarth Road (A4160) for traffic going in and out of Cardiff city centre.

The most recent development, which began at the end of 2006 and into 2007 was the widening of the road between the Cogan Viaduct and the Ferry Road Interchange to a 3-lane dual-carriageway.  A new junction was also built for the Cardiff International Sports Village directly from Cogan Spur; also the Barons Court roundabout was replaced by a signal controlled crossroad.  The main contractor for this project was Laing O'Rourke Civil Engineering.
     
 Cogan Viaduct

The Cogan Viaduct is the most important element of the Cogan Spur as it crosses the River Ely with a central span of 95 metres (312 ft). It is made from a multi-span glued segmental structure of rectangular box sections. The Cogan Viaduct was again designed by South Glamorgan County Council, who won a Concrete Society Commendation in 1989 for the design.

Central Link Road (A4234) 

The £8.5 million Central Link between the Queen's Gate Roundabout and the junction on Adam Street on the A4160 was opened on 16 February 1989. When it was first opened it only linked Cardiff city centre with Cardiff Bay.  It was not until the Butetown Link was opened on 27 March 1995 that this road started to be used as a link to the motorway network, Penarth and the Vale of Glamorgan.  It will not be until the Eastern Bay Link is built, when traffic from the city centre will use it to travel east, that it will be fully used.  The length of the A4234 is just  and is entirely a two lane dual carriageway with clearway restrictions.

Abandoned spur roads

Ely Spur 

The Ely Spur was planned to run from a new interchange on the Ely Link Road to the Ely Bridge Roundabout on the A48.  It was only  in length, but it would have reduced through traffic in the residential area of Ely, namely on Cowbridge Road West traveling to and from the A48.  But it has now been announced that this proposal has now been officially abandoned.

Cardiff Airport Link Road 

The Cardiff Airport Link Road was a proposed spur road off of the A4232 through to Cardiff Airport, when plans for the road were scrapped by the WAG in June 2009. The single carriageway A4050 road, from Cardiff to Cardiff Airport is currently the main road from Barry to Cardiff and is the main commuter route. There were 4 proposed schemes linking the Ely Link Road, south of the Culverhouse Cross Interchange, through to the A4226 north of Barry. The estimated cost of this scheme would have been £96m, including the widening of the A4232.

Services 

The PDR has two service stations for motorists, one at Cardiff West on the Capel Llanilltern Interchange and the other at Cardiff Gate on the Pentwyn Interchange.  The services at Cardiff West includes BP petrol, a Travelodge, Burger King, Costa Coffee and W H Smith, while the services at Cardiff Gate includes Shell petrol, a Hotel Ibis, Burger King, KFC, Starbucks, Waitrose and W H Smith. 
  
Traffic Wales is the Welsh Government's traffic information service, it is a partnership between the Welsh Government, the two Trunk Road Agents (South Wales TRA / North & Mid Wales TRA) and the WTTC consultancy Amey.  In South Wales the service is managed from the South Wales Traffic Management Centre, also home to INRIX Media's studio, providing live travel information for the media. The Traffic Wales website has five live traffic webcams on the Capel Llanilltern – Culverhouse Cross Link Road (Trunk Road) and the images are updated every 5 minutes. Traffic Wales also operates a Traffic Information Hotline, motorists can use this telephone service by dialling an 0845 number, which gives up to date traffic information and travel advice.

Traffic congestion 

Since the western link roads were built, a number of major developments have been built, such as the Cardiff Bay Retail Park, IKEA, Celtic Gateway, Cardiff International Sports Village that includes the Cardiff International Pool, Cardiff International White Water and Cardiff Arena, which have all generated additional traffic at the Ferry Road Interchange. In addition, the Leckwith development, which includes Cardiff City Stadium, Cardiff International Sports Stadium and the Capital Retail Park with a new Asda supermarket, have also significantly increased traffic on the Leckwith Interchange. At the Culverhouse Cross Interchange, older developments such as the Brooklands Retail Park, Wenvoe Retail Park and Valegate Retail Park, including Tesco and Marks & Spencer have also significantly increased congestion along with commuter traffic from the Vale of Glamorgan. From 1989 to 1997 there had been an increase in traffic of 78% and a further increase of 35% by 2016 is predicted by the Assembly. The Vale of Glamorgan Council also expressed reservations about the new developments of the Cardiff International Sports Village and the Cardiff City Stadium, which includes the Capital Retail Park.  On 18 October 2006, the council requested that the WAG assess the existing traffic conditions and future growth in traffic on the network.

Popular culture 

The Queen's Gate Tunnel was featured in the first ever episode of Torchwood. The Grangetown Link featured in the 2006 Christmas episode of Doctor Who. The Tunnel again featured in Doctor Who in 2009. Serving as a stand in for the Dartford tunnel

See also
Transport in Cardiff
Trunk roads in Wales

References

See also
 Cardiff & Newport A-Z Street Atlas 2007 Edition

External links

Map of the Ely Viaduct on the Capel Llanilltern - Culverhouse Cross Link Road

South Wales Trunk Road Agent website
Photo of Grangetown Viaduct being built

Webcams on the Capel Llanilltern – Culverhouse Cross Link Road (Trunk Road)
The following images updates every five minutes – click 'refresh' for the latest.
Capel Llanilltern Junction (A4232 and M4 J33)
South of Capel Llanilltern
North of St Brides-super-Ely
South of St Brides-super-Ely
St Fagans Slip Road

Roads in Cardiff
Roads in the Vale of Glamorgan
Roads in Wales